Vlasichev is a surname. Notable people with the surname include:

Anatoliy Vlasichev (born 1988), Kyrgyzstani footballer
Andrei Vlasichev (born 1981), Uzbekistani footballer